The Big Inch and Little Big Inch, collectively known as the Inch pipelines, are petroleum pipelines extending from Texas to New Jersey, built between 1942 and 1944 as emergency war measures in the U.S. Before World War II, petroleum products were transported from the oil fields of Texas to the north-eastern states by sea by oil tankers. After the United States entered the war on 1 January 1942, this vital link was attacked by German submarines in Operation Paukenschlag, threatening both the oil supplies to the north-east and its onward transshipment to Great Britain. The Secretary of the Interior, Harold Ickes, championed the pipeline project as a way of transporting petroleum by the more-secure, interior route.

The pipelines were government financed and owned, but were built and operated by the War Emergency Pipelines company, a non-profit corporation backed by a consortium of the largest American oil companies. It was praised as an example of private-public sector cooperation and featured extensively in US government propaganda.

After the end of the war there were extended arguments over how the pipelines should be used. In 1947, the Texas East Transmission Corporation purchased the pipelines for $143,127,000, the largest post-war disposal of war-surplus property. The corporation converted them to transport natural gas, transforming the energy market in the north-east. The Little Big Inch was returned to carry oil in 1957. The pipelines are owned by Spectra Energy Partners and Enterprise Products and remain in use.

Background

By the time that the United States entered World War II in 1941, oil was a vital part of military operations around the world. The United States produced 60 percent of the world's crude oil, with the state of Texas in the south-west leading this production, producing more than twice as much crude as any other state. The industry comprised a handful of very large producers and more than 3,500 smaller operators.

The north-east coast of the United States depended on these supplies of oil, importing both crude and refined products. Across most of Texas, there had been little interest in building pipelines to transport oil, and petroleum was typically moved from the south-west to the north-east coast using a mixture of sea freight and railroad transport. In early 1941, 70,000 barrels of oil were moved on the railroads each day, but this method was expensive, and the bulk of the oil was moved using barges, some with a capacity of up to 15,000 barrels, operating up and down rivers and the Atlantic Coast.

With the outbreak of war, the eastern sea routes of the country were attacked by German U-boat submarines. United States naval defence was very limited and largely obsolete; between January and April 1942, among other naval losses, 46 oil tankers were sunk and 16 damaged. The problem was made worse as 50 tankers had been sent to help the UK earlier in 1941. Insurers began to refuse to underwrite the remaining vessels and the volume of crude oil reaching the north-east from the Texas Gulf dropped.

In response, steps were taken to better protect the tankers from attack, but losses continued to mount until, in April 1942, they were banned by the Navy from operating the north-east sea routes. The government and industry took steps to maximise the use of the railroads, increasing the amount of oil carried on them more than ten-fold, but there were shortages of rail tank cars, and the existing fleet of cars was in poor condition. Instead, the United States government began to examine options for the use of pipelines to fulfil the demand for petroleum in the north-east.

Concept

Transporting petroleum by pipeline from the south-west to the north-east was a potentially attractive option for the government as it would be safe from submarine attack and could operate efficiently regardless of the weather. Technologies to build high-pressure pipes at sizes larger than  began to emerge during the two decades before the war, but their adoption was not commercially viable.

The concept of constructing such a pipeline was first proposed in 1940 by the Secretary of the Interior, Harold Ickes, who argued that "the building of a crude oil pipeline from Texas to the East might not be economically sound; but that in the event of an emergency it might be absolutely necessary". A consortium led by Standard Oil put forward a bid to build one in spring 1941, but the plan failed, due to concerns over the amount of steel that would be required for such a project. In May 1941, Ickes was appointed as the Petroleum Coordinator for National Defense, and in December 1942 became the administrator of the Petroleum Administration for War. New laws were passed to enable the building of pipelines necessary for the war effort, including the compulsory purchasing of land under the right of eminent domain.

Initial planning for the Inch pipelines began on May 15, 1941, when a meeting of Ickes and the oil industry commissioned an aerial survey of the possible route. A preliminary design was ready that September, and a consortium of major oil companies formed a new company, National Defense Pipelines, to build a pipeline along the route. The government Supply Priorities and Allocations Board, however, refused to approve the necessary steel, and the consortium's plan was dissolved shortly before the outbreak of war. After the outbreak of fighting, and the consequent deterioration of the sea routes for transporting oil, industry representatives met in March 1942 to produce a new pipeline strategy, called the Tulsa Plan. This included the construction of the Inch pipelines, backed by the slogan "longlines are lifelines", for which the steel was finally approved by the War Production Board on June 10.

Once steel supplies had been agreed, an initial tranche of $35 million in funding was provided by the government Reconstruction Finance Corporation, which owned and manage the operation of the pipelines through its subsidiary organizations, the Defense Plant Corporation and the Defense Supplies Corporation. In turn, the actual construction and operation of the pipelines would be carried out by the War Emergency Pipelines company (WEP), a non-profit corporation backed by a consortium of the largest oil companies in the United States: Atlantic Refining, Cities Service Oil, Consolidated Oil, Gulf Oil, Pan American Petroleum and Transportation, Standard Oil, Tidewater Associated Oil, Shell Oil, Socony-Vacuum Oil, Sun Oil and the Texas Pipe Line Company. The WEP was led by Burt Hull and W. Alton Jones, both with extensive backgrounds in the industry, with Oscar Wolfe as its chief engineer. The company established its offices in Little Rock, Arkansas.

Construction

Design and management

The Inch pipelines comprised two systems, the Big Inch pipeline and the Little Big Inch pipeline. The Big Inch was a  pipeline for crude oil; it ran from the East Texas Oil Field at Longview, Texas, to Norris City, Illinois, and on to Phoenixville, Pennsylvania, from where it branched into  segments. One served New York and terminated at Linden, New Jersey, and the other served Philadelphia and terminated at Chester Junction, Pennsylvania. The Little Big Inch, a largely parallel  line intended for refined products, ran from Beaumont, Texas, to Little Rock, Arkansas, where it joined the path of the Big Inch, making use of the same pumping stations. From there it ran along the same right-of-way as the Big Inch to New Jersey and Pennsylvania.

The pipeline project was the longest, biggest and heaviest of its kind in the world.

Charles Cathers of the DPC directed the engineering project, with much of the work undertaken by Oscar Wolfe and, on the Little Inch pipeline, F. E. Richardson and L. F. Scherer. A meeting of all of the contractors for the build was held at the start of the July to kickstart the project; overall, 82 different companies would take on the pipeline work on a "cost-plus" basis, employing over 16,000 staff. The construction required the government to acquire permission to build the pipeline across 7,500 parcels of land; of these, the right of eminent domain had to be exercised in 300 cases. Major Jubel Parten, a director in the Petroleum Administration for War, considered the Inch pipelines to be part of “the most amazing Government-industry cooperation ever achieved”.

The pipelines were soon given the names "Big Inch" and "Little Big Inch" by the construction teams, on account of their unprecedented diameters. The construction project was extensively advertised, as part of the US government's war-time propaganda effort. Newsreels ran clips such as Pipeline Goes Through! and Pipe Dream Comes True-Oil!, and short-films were made about the construction work, including Pipeline. The pipelines also appeared in the RKO Pathé film Oil is Blood.

Process

In total, 21,185 railcar loads of steel piping were laid during the project, the Big Inch alone requiring  of steel.

The pipes were then cleaned by pulling a workman through the inside of them with cloths, and welded together, using both the "stovepiping" method and the roll-weld, or "firing line", methods. Stovepiping was an older method, in which the welder worked his way around two pipes, which remained stationary; the newer roll-weld approach instead rotated the pipes, allowing the welder to remain in one position as he worked, with up to seven pipes being welded together at the same time.

Where it was necessary for the pipeline to curve to fit the route, the steel pipes were bent, using either a cold-bending approach, in which tractors would pull and push the pipelines into position, or a hot-bending method, with the pipe heated up by blow-torches and pulled into place using a jig. A new, specialized piece of equipment for bending pipes, the Cummings bending jig, was invented during the Big Inch build, and used on the construction of the Little Big Inch pipeline. To protect the pipeline from corrosion, its outside was then cleaned by machine, and painted in first a layer of coal tar enamel, and then hot coal tar coating, before being wrapped in asbestos felt. Finally the pipeline was lowered into position, taking care not to damage the ends of the pipes; the larger pipes were so heavy that they required a D-8 caterpillar tractor equipped with counter-weights to lift them. The trench was then back-filled, completing the process.

The Big Inch pipeline had to pass under 33 rivers and 200 creeks and lakes, as well as under 289 railroad and 626 highway intersections. Specially lined tunnels were bored to lay the pipe under the roads and railroad lines, and specialist trenches dug to lay the pipelines across on the riverbeds and lakes, weighing down the pipeline to stop it floating to the surface. Around  of underwater piping was laid in total. In marshy areas, the soft ground was filled in to provide firm foundations for the pipeline to rest on.

The plain, utilitarian buildings were initially prefabricated steel constructs, but as supplies grew scarce, wood was used instead.

Completion

Work on the Inch pipelines began immediately after the establishment of the WEP on June 26, 1942. They were built in three phases. The first part to be constructed was the Big Inch, its initial leg running to an interim terminal at Norris City, where oil was to be off-loaded to the railroad network. Once this leg was complete, it was extended to its terminus at Phoenixville. When the Big Inch was complete, work began on the third phase of the project, the Little Big Inch.

To meet a construction deadline of January 1, 1943, the laying of pipe began on August 3, 1942, near Little Rock. Other pipeline crews began work immediately on segments elsewhere in Arkansas and Texas. By September 10 all eight pipelaying crews, each consisting of between 300 and 400 men, were in the field working. But soon men were laying as much as  a day. Oil began flowing through the Big Inch Line between Texas and Illinois on New Year's Eve 1942. Work on the Little Big Inch then began in 1943.

The first crude oil arrived at Phoenixville via the Big Inch on August 14, 1943, and the first refined product in the Little Big Inch arrived on March 2, 1944. The Big Inch carried up to 334,456 barrels of crude oil a day, the Little Big Inch 239,844 barrels of gasoline; the lines were among the largest industrial consumers of electricity in the US, requiring 3.89 million kilowatt hours a day to pump the oil along the pipes.

Construction process, recorded by John Vachon

Post-war sale

By the end of the war, there was considerable debate over the future of the pipelines. The major oil companies, such as Standard Oil, campaigned for the conversion of the pipelines for the transfer of natural gas. Engineers contracted to the US Surplus Property Administration proposed using the lines for natural gas, and the Tennessee Gas and Transmission Company conducted a four-month  trial. Demand for natural gas was rising rapidly, and it was produced in large quantities in the Texas oilfields, but could not be got to market in the north-east and was otherwise burnt off uselessly into the atmosphere. The railroad and coal companies, who saw this as likely to introduce additional competition for coal and coal gas, and therefore lower demand for their goods and services, argued against this move. The smaller oil companies proposed continuing to use the pipelines for oil in order to undermine the transport monopolies of the larger corporations.

A government inquiry was undertaken to determine the future use of the pipelines, and took evidence from the various stakeholders, most of whom presented the case that favored their companies or industry. The inquiry concluded that the pipelines should be sold for continued use in transporting petroleum. An auction for the pipelines was announced in 1946, which was designed to give preference to bidders who intended to use them for moving petroleum. 16 bids were received, with the highest cash bidders being companies hoping to use the pipelines for natural gas. Assessing the different bids proved difficult and the discussions became enmeshed in national politics, with companies seeking support from various Washington politicians. Meanwhile, a threatened national coal strike raised concerns over the availability of natural gas, strengthening the arguments of the natural gas lobby.

A fresh inquiry was declared in November, voiding the previous competition and the Inch Lines were transferred to the War Assets Administration on December 2, 1946, for disposal. Pending any final decision on their sale, the lines were leased to the Tennessee Gas Company for use in shipping natural gas as far as Ohio and the Appalachians, but no further east, and only for 12 months. Tennessee Gas did not convert the pipelines in any way for their new role, and simply pumped the gas through the system under its own pressure, moving  of gas a day in this way.

A second auction was held, with bids for natural gas given equal weight to those wishing to transfer crude oil, although any natural gas bidder would be obliged to maintain the oil pumping stations for use in a national emergency. Ten bids were received and on February 8, 1947, the Texas East Transmission Corporation (TETCO) was declared successful. Its bid of $143,127,000 would make the disposal the largest sale of war-surplus property to the private sector following World War II.

Conversion by TETCO

TETCO was the brainchild of corporate lawyers Charles Francis and James Elkins, who convinced the construction specialists George and Herman Brown, and the fuel engineer E. Holley Poe, that buying the Big and Little Inch pipelines could be a lucrative opportunity. The corporation was established specifically for the purposes of the bid, and came to their bidding figure by estimating that the likely competition would bid at $130 million; their own figure exceeded this by 10 percent, and added on $127,000 to avoid a suspiciously round number. TETCO believed it could afford to make this offer because it intended to reuse the electric motors in the oil pumping mechanisms for moving the natural gas; it also believed that the price of gas would rise considerably in the post-war markets.

After winning the bidding, TETCO raised the money to pay the government through a combination of bonds and share issues. A further government enquiry was required before the sale was allowed to go through, which was complicated by the reluctance of the state of Pennsylvania to allow the pipelines to be used to pump gas east through its territory. The government of Pennsylvania was influenced by the coal industry, who feared they would lose sales, but it eventually relented and the sale of the pipelines to TETCO was finally completed on November 1. The value of the company soared, and the original investors saw the value of their holdings increase 63-fold.

TETCO immediately began to convert the pipelines for permanent use as natural gas transmission lines, under the direction of Baxter Goodrich, their chief engineer.
Steel valves replaced the older, less reliable cast iron designs. Demand continued to increase, requiring additional compressor capability, and by January 1949 the pipelines were moving  a day.

The supply route undermined the local markets for manufactured gas, and the major cities of the north-east rapidly converted to the use of natural gas; historian David Waples describes how the pipelines contributed to "an extraordinary expansion of natural gas customers and gas company employees after World War II". The Inch pipelines encouraged the development of further long distance pipelines in the US through the 1960s and 1970s.

Later use

In 1957, the operation of the Little Big Inch, and its ownership south of Ohio, was transferred from TETCO to the subsidiary Texas Eastern Petroleum Products Corporation (TEPPCO), and converted back to use for petroleum products. TEPPCO was purchased by Enterprise Products in 2010. Around 1961, there was discussion of converting the Big Inch pipeline back to petroleum use, but it continued in use as a gas pipeline. In 1989, TETCO was taken over by the Panhandle Eastern Corporation, and in 1997 this company was merged with Duke Power, to form the Duke Energy Corporation; in 2007, the oil pipelines were spun off from Duke Energy, to form part of Spectra Energy Partners.

The Inch pipelines are listed on the National Register of Historic Places. Along the western parts of the pipelines, around 90 percent of the pipes are the original installation, although in the east large parts have since been replaced, largely due to the absence of anti-corrosion protective coatings on the original piping. 62 of the original buildings from 1942 and 1943 remain, including pump-houses, offices, employee houses and garages. The best surviving examples of the original buildings are in Pennsylvania. A "Big Inch pipeline" construction playset was produced as a children's toy in 1962 by the Marx company.

List of pumping stations

Big Inch and northern Little Big Inch

 Station No. 1: Longview, Texas
 Station No. 2: Atlanta, Texas
 Station No. 3: Hope, Arkansas
 Station No. 4: Donaldson, Arkansas
 Station No. 5: Little Rock, Arkansas
 Station No. 6: Bald Knob, Arkansas
 Station No. 7: Egypt, Arkansas
 Station No. 8: Fagus, Missouri
 Station No. 9-a: Oran, Missouri
 Station No. 9-b: Gale, Illinois
 Station No. 10: Lick Creek, Illinois
 Station No. 11: Norris City, Illinois
 Station No. 12: Princeton, Indiana
 Station No. 13: French Lick, Indiana
 Station No. 14: Seymour, Indiana
 Station No. 15: Oldenburg, Indiana
 Station No. 16: Lebanon, Ohio
 Station No. 17: Circleville, Ohio
 Station No. 18: Crooksville, Ohio
 Station No. 19: Sarahsville, Ohio
 Station No. 20: Wind Ridge, Pennsylvania
 Station No. 21: Connellsville, Pennsylvania
 Station No. 22: Rockwood, Pennsylvania
 Station No. 23: Chambersburg, Pennsylvania
 Station No. 24: Marietta, Pennsylvania
 Station No. 25: Phoenixville, Pennsylvania
 Station No. 26: Lambertville, New Jersey
 Station No. 27: Linden, New Jersey

Southern part of the Little Big Inch
 Station A: Baytown, Texas
 Station B: Beaumont, Texas
 Station C: Newton, Texas
 Station D: Many, Louisiana
 Station E: Castor, Louisiana
 Station F: El Dorado, Arkansas
 Station G: Fordyce, Arkansas

See also
 Operation Pluto, another World War II petroleum pipeline

References

Bibliography

External links
Historic American Engineering Record (HAER) documentation:

Pipe Dream Comes True-Oil! news-reel

Crude oil pipelines in the United States
Natural gas pipelines in the United States
Petroleum in Texas
United States home front during World War II
1941 in the United States
1942 in the United States
1943 in the United States
1944 in the United States
History of the petroleum industry in the United States
Historic American Engineering Record in Arkansas
Historic American Engineering Record in New Jersey
Historic American Engineering Record in Texas
Transportation buildings and structures on the National Register of Historic Places
Transportation buildings and structures on the National Register of Historic Places in Texas
Energy infrastructure on the National Register of Historic Places
Oil pipelines in Texas
Oil pipelines in Arkansas
Oil pipelines in Missouri
Oil pipelines in Illinois
Oil pipelines in Indiana
Pipelines in Ohio
Oil pipelines in Pennsylvania
Oil pipelines in New Jersey
Oil pipelines in Louisiana
Natural gas pipelines in Texas
Natural gas pipelines in Arkansas
Natural gas pipelines in Missouri
Natural gas pipelines in Illinois
Natural gas pipelines in Indiana
Natural gas pipelines in Ohio
Natural gas pipelines in Pennsylvania
Natural gas pipelines in New Jersey